The 1902 South Dakota Coyotes football team was an American football team that represented the University of South Dakota as an independent during the 1902 college football season. In its first season under head coach Arthur H. Whittemore, the team compiled a 10–0 record, shut out every opponent, and outscored them by a total of 238 to 0.

Schedule

References

South Dakota
South Dakota Coyotes football seasons
College football undefeated seasons
South Dakota Coyotes football